A myriad is 10,000 or an indefinitely large number.

Myriad may also refer to:

Computing
 Marconi Myriad, an early computer
 Myriad Group, a Swiss software company
 Myriad Search, a metasearch engine
 Myriad, a processor by Movidius

Literature
 Myriad Editions, a British publishing house
 Myriad (Image Comics), a fictional character
 Myriad (DC Comics), a character in the "Bloodlines" story arc
 Myriad, an anthology comic book series published by Approbation Comics

Music
 The Myriad, an American band
 Myriads, a Gothic metal band from Norway
 MYRIAD, a performance installation accompanying the 2018 album Age Of

Other uses 
 Myriad (area), a unit of area
 Myriad (typeface)
 "Myriad" (Supergirl), an episode of Supergirl
 Myriad Botanical Gardens, in Oklahoma City, U.S.
 Myriad CIWS, a close-in weapon system
 Myriad Convention Center, now Cox Convention Center, in Oklahoma City, U.S.
 Myriad Genetics, an American molecular diagnostic company
 Myriad Islands, in Antarctica
 Myriad Pictures, an American entertainment company
 Myriad year clock, a universal clock
 Myriad Games, publisher of the video game Caltron 6 in 1

See also
 Myriade, a European miniaturized satellite platform